Tomarinsky District is an administrative district (raion) of Sakhalin Oblast, Russia; one of the seventeen in the oblast. Municipally, it is incorporated as Tomarinsky Urban Okrug. It is located in the southwest of the Island of Sakhalin. Its administrative center is the town of Tomari. Population:  The population of Tomari accounts for 48.0% of the district's total population.

References

Notes

Sources

Districts of Sakhalin Oblast